Terreform ONE  is a 501c3 non-profit architecture and urban think tank that advances ecological design in derelict municipal areas. By formulating unsolicited feasibility studies and egalitarian designs, their mission is to illustrate speculative environmental plans for New York City and other cities worldwide.  Their intention is to support community outreach and master plan solutions in underprivileged areas that do not have direct access to qualified architects and urban designers.

They are a pro bono studio and lab for adept architects, planners, scientists, and urban studies specialists to investigate and refine the broader framework of ecological city design.  The organization strives to inspire unique solutions for global sustainability in the following categories; air quality, smart mobility, renewable power, infrastructure, food access, recycling waste processes, clean water, and equitable economies.  The group seeks to encourage public appreciation for the numerous methods in which architecture and urban design improves human life.

History
The organization was co-founded in May 2006 by Mitchell Joachim, Maria Aiolova and others in response to the need for urgent long-standing research on sustainable cities. After entering a series of open design competitions the organization then began taking on a number of urban projects, engaging local neighborhoods with members of the design community to broaden a ground up alternative to overdevelopment.

Activity

To further the humanitarian aim of Terrform ONE's directives, the group began offering the ONE Prize, a public design and science award focused on green urbanity. Over the years the jury has included some of the most notable figures in urban pedagogy and practice: NYC Planning Commissioner Amanda Burden, Parks Commissioner Adrian Benepe, Michael Colgrove, Helena Durst, Bjarke Ingels, Kate Ascher, James Corner, Carol Coletta, William J. Mitchell, Margaret Crawford, Cameron Sinclair, among others.

ONE Lab and TerreFarm  are two educational components of Terreform ONE. These collaborative schools receive forty students each year from around the world to learn about topics including synthetic biology, urban farming, parametric computation, ecological landscapes, rapid prototyping, and urban theory. A public lecture series occurs during the seminars, with notable designers Vito Acconci, Dickson Despommier, Natalie Jeremijenko, and Christian Hubert.

Terreform ONE has been officially selected to participate in the Venice Biennale of Architecture.

Structure
With multiple chapters and constituents in various countries around the globe, they are structured into five divisions under the parent organization Terre ONE (Open Network Ecology) as follows; Terreform ONE – Architectural and Urban Research Hub, Terreform ONE Lab - School for Design and Science, Terreform ONE Prize – Annual Juried Competition, Terreform ONE Global – International Fellowship Program, Terreform ONE Event - Host for City Experience Venues.

Recognition
They are the winners of ARCHITECT R+D Awards,  and the Victor Papanek Social Design Award  sponsored by the University of Applied Arts Vienna, the Austrian Cultural Forum New York, and the Museum of Arts and Design.  Terreform ONE is equally honored with the Zumtobel Group Award for Sustainability and Humanity for the project, New York City Resource & Mobility. Terreform was also a recipient of the Infiniti Design Excellence Award for the History Channel City of the Future competition. They have earned a Bronze Medal from iGEM (International Genetically Engineered Machine) for the Gen2Seat fully organic chair product. In 2013, Terreform ONE were winners of the AIA New York Urban Design Merit Award for their Urbaneer: Resilient Waterfront Infrastructure work. The group also received an Architizer A+ Award for the Bio City World Map of 11 Billion.

Urban projects
 Urbaneering Brooklyn 
 Homeway: The Great Suburban Exodus 
 Fab Tree Hab
 Rapid Re(f)use 
 SOFT Lamb Car 
 Green Brain: Smart Park for a New City 
 New York 2106: Self-Sufficient City 
 Jetpack Packing and Blimp Bumper Bus 
 In Vitro Meat Habitat.

Comparable organizations
Similar groups include; The Forum for Urban Design, Architecture for Humanity, Project for Public Spaces, The Center for Urban Pedagogy, Storefront for Art and Architecture, Institute for Architecture and Urban Studies, and Rocky Mountain Institute.

See also

References

External links
 Terreform.org
 Terreform.com
 Meat house

Architecture organizations based in the United States
Urban design
Architectural design
Organizations established in 2006
Development charities based in the United States
Environmental organizations based in New York City
Organizations based in Brooklyn